was a Japanese educator and politician who was a member of the House of Representatives.

Biography
Hide Hirata, whose maiden name was Nihei, was born on 23 June 1902 in Fukushima Prefecture. She graduated from the Fukushima Prefecture Normal School's first department in 1922, and from the Nara Women's Higher Normal School Housework Department in 1926.

In March 1926, she became a teacher at Fukushima Prefectural Soma East High School. After then, she worked as a teacher at Iwate Prefectural Morioka Second High School and Kaohsiung Municipal Kaohsiung Girls' Senior High School.

After the end of World War II, in 1947 she was commissioned by the Wakamatsu City Board of Education and Research and the Fukushima Prefectural Board of Education's Wakamatsu District Council. In July 1948, she became the Child Welfare Manager in charge of the Wakamatsu area. She was an attempted candidate from the Fukushima 2nd district for the Social Democratic Party in the 1953 Japanese general election. She later won in the 1955 Japanese general election and served one term in the House of Representatives, serving as the head of the Education Policy Committee and as her party's Social Security Policy Chair.

Hirata was a counselor and mediator at the Fukushima Family Court, a director of the Aizu Children's Garden, a director of the Women's Issues Study Group, and a civil mediator at the Shibuya Summary Court.

Hirata died on 4 January 1978.

References

衆議院・参議院編『議会制度百年史 - 衆議院議員名鑑』大蔵省印刷局、1990年。
『日本女性人名辞典〔普及版〕』日本図書センター、1998年。
上田正昭他『日本人名大辞典』講談社、2001年。
本田久市『福祉は人なり : 福島県社会福祉人物史抄』歴史春秋出版〈歴春ふくしま文庫72〉、2007年。

1902 births
1978 deaths
Japanese schoolteachers
Female members of the House of Representatives (Japan)
Members of the House of Representatives (Japan)
Japanese expatriates in Taiwan
People from Fukushima Prefecture